Charles Doland Crisp OBE (18 February 1864 – 5 February 1956) was an English local politician and association football administrator. Crisp was Mayor of Lewes for 11 years.

While attached to London Regiment he was made into a Lieutenant colonel. He served in World War I and was appointed an OBE for organising the "all clear" messages after enemy bombing raids. In World War II he was the Air Raid Precautions sub-controller for Lewes.

In a long career in association football, Crisp was a player (goalkeeper), referee and administrator. He founded the Athenian League, was a member of the Football Association council and served as a director of Arsenal and Chelsea. He was chairman of the Middlesex County Football Association from 1907 until 1954.

References

1864 births
1956 deaths
People from Lewes
Officers of the Order of the British Empire
English footballers
Arsenal F.C. directors and chairmen
Chelsea F.C. non-playing staff
English politicians
English football referees
British Army personnel of World War I
London Regiment officers
Civil Defence Service personnel
Association footballers not categorized by position